The 1999 National Hurling League, known for sponsorship reasons as the Church & General National Hurling League, was the 68th edition of the National Hurling League (NHL), an annual hurling competition for the GAA county teams. Tipperary won the league, beating Galway by 1-14 to 1-10 in the final.

Structure
There are 14 teams in Division 1, divided into 1A and 1B. Each team plays all the others once, either home or away. Teams earn one point for a draw and two for a win. The top teams in 1A and 1B play each other in the NHL final. The bottom teams in each group play each other in a relegation playoff.

There are 10 teams in Division 2. The top two play each other in the final, with the winner promoted. The bottom team is relegated.

There are 9 teams in Division 3. The top two play each other in the final, with the winner promoted.

Division 1

Cork came into the season as defending champions of the 1998 season. Kerry and Down entered Division 1 as the promoted teams.

On 2 May 1999, Tipperary won the title following a 1-14 - 1-10 win over Galway in the final. It was their first league title since 1993-94 and their 17th National League title overall.

Down, who lost all of their group stage matches, were relegated from Division 1 after losing the relegation play-off to Kerry by 2-13 to 0-12.

Galway's Eugene Cloonan was the Division 1 top scorer with 7-49.

Group 1A table

Group stage

Group 1B table

Group stage

Relegation play-off

Knock-out stage

Semi-finals

Final

Scoring statistics

Top scorers overall

Top scorers in a single game

Division 2

Division 2 table

Knock-out stage

Division 3

Knock-out stage

External links
 1999 National Hurling League results

References

League
National Hurling League seasons